In the Philippines, a nuisance candidate is an official term for an aspirant candidate for a public office whose certificate of candidacy was not accepted by the Commission on Elections (COMELEC) either motu proprio by the election body itself or upon a verified petition of an interested party.

Legal definition
Section 69 of the Omnibus Election Code states that a nuisance candidate is someone who has filed a certificate of candidacy with the intention of:

putting the election process in mockery or disrepute
causing confusion among voters by the similarity of their name to other registered candidates
other circumstances or acts which clearly demonstrate that the candidate has no bona fide intention to run for the office for which the certificate of candidacy has been filed and is consequently preventing a faithful determination of the true will of the electorate.

The Law Department of the COMELEC in Manila has the sole authority to declare someone a nuisance candidate. Regional and provincial COMELEC offices has no jurisdiction regarding the matter.

Managing candidacies
COMELEC also cannot prevent persons from filing certificates of candidacy even if they were declared a nuisance candidate in the past. The election body could also determine those who aspire to run as Independents as nuisance candidates if they could not prove their capacity to independently launch an election campaign. The capability to launch a campaign is not necessarily equate to the financial resources of an aspirant. A candidate may have enough supporters to conduct a campaign. The Supreme Court ruled in Marquez vs. COMELEC that not being financially capable to mount a nationwide campaign is not a reason for the commission to declare someone as a nuisance candidate.

During the 18th Congress, a bill has been proposed imposing a fine on aspirants who were deemed to be nuisance candidates.

Notable nuisance candidates

The following people who filed certificates of candidacy for a public office at the national level (Senator, Vice President, President) were officially declared as nuisance candidates by COMELEC:

Key
 Put the election process in mockery or disrepute.
 Caused confusion among the voters by the similarity of the names of the registered candidates.
 Other circumstances or acts which clearly demonstrate that the candidate has no bona fide intention to run for the office for which the certificate of candidacy has been filed and thus prevents a faithful determination of the true will of the electorate
 No Information

For President

For Senator

See also
Fringe candidate
Non-human electoral candidates
List of frivolous political parties

References

Elections in the Philippines
Electoral restrictions